Sven August Körling (14 April 1842 – 17 October 1919) was a Swedish composer, remembered for his  art songs. Early in his career Jussi Björling recorded Körling's song "Evening mood". Körling's "Pastorale" for horn and organ dates from 1898 to 1899.

Notes

1842 births
1919 deaths
Swedish composers
Swedish male composers